Vasudev Devnani is an Indian politician from Rajasthan belonging to the Bharatiya Janata Party. He was the Minister of State for School Education Independent Charge Government of Rajasthan, serving as its "RSS face," after the Hindu nationalist organisation Rashtriya Swayamsevak Sangh (RSS) of which he is a member.

Life and career 
Vasudev Devnani was born in Ajmer on 11 January 1950. He received B.E. degree in Electrical Engineering from one of the finest and oldest colleges, MBM Engineering college, Jodhpur. After that he went on to an academic career, eventually becoming the Dean of Vidhya Bhawan Polytechnic College in Udaipur.

He is married to Indira Devnani, a retired school teacher. The couple have one son and two daughters.

Political career 
Devnani joined the Rashtriya Swayamsevak Sangh (RSS) at a young age and later its student wing Akhil Bharatiya Vidyarthi Parishad (ABVP), serving as the Rajasthan state president of the latter for nine years. Subsequently, he joined the Bharatiya Janata Party (BJP).

Devnani was elected to the Legislative Assembly of Rajasthan from the Ajmer North constituency in 2003, obtaining 45% of the total votes.  He was elected again in 2008 and 2013.

He was a Minister of State for technical education in the Ministry of Vasundhara Raje in 2003-08. He was a Minister of State with an independent charge for primary and secondary education in the Ministry of Vasundhara Raje in 2013-18.

Political and administrative views 
According to India Today, he is striking a balance between modernity, essential reforms and the BJP agenda of Hindu culture-based education. Among his saffronisation measures are celebrating Basant Panchami in schools, singing Saraswati vandana and performing surya namaskar every day. He plans to introduce Rajasthan heroes such as Maharana Pratap in the school textbooks, correcting the alleged "anti-Hindu agenda" of the previous Congress government. 186 new Model Schools are being named after Vivekananda. Despite being the "RSS face" in the Vasundhara Raje government, India Today believed he was exhibiting great political and administrative skill in ensuring that the saffron moves do not overshadow the real task of improving the education system. However, his measures to introduce compulsory Saraswati puja and surya namaskar have invited opposition from the schools run by the Arya Samaj, Muslim community and the Christian missionaries.

Devnani declared that the "Indian value system" would be introduced in schools from 2015-16. He called for a National Education Regulatory Board for the fast implementation of the Indian value system in schools nationwide.

In April 2015, Devnani hit the headlines with stories that reported that Isaac Newton, Pythagoras and Akbar are being eliminated from the school textbooks. "Why should our children only learn about Akbar, the Great? Why not Maharana Pratap, the Great?" he reportedly asked. "Our children are constantly learning about foreign rulers, mathematicians, scientists et al." These "foreign" scientists and intellectuals are being eliminated in favour of "local and national" heroes, Veer Savarkar, Subhas Chandra Bose, Bhagat Singh, Maharaja Suraj Mal, Aryabhata and Bhaskaracharya.

In March 2016, Devnani announced that "major changes" were being made in the school curriculum, by including the biographies of freedom fighters, so as to ensure that "no one like Kanhaiya Kumar" would be born again. In view of the events at the Jawaharlal Nehru University, he said that it was necessary to inculcate a "feeling of patriotism" in the students.

See also 
 Saffronisation
 Dinanath Batra
 Smriti Irani

References 

1948 births
Living people
Bharatiya Janata Party politicians from Rajasthan
Rajasthani people
Rajasthan MLAs 2013–2018
Rajasthan MLAs 2003–2008
Rajasthan MLAs 2008–2013
Rashtriya Swayamsevak Sangh members
People from Ajmer
Rajasthan MLAs 2018–2023